Uclesia is a genus of bristle flies in the family Tachinidae.

Species
Uclesia antiqua Mesnil, 1963
Uclesia brevinervis Mesnil, 1974
Uclesia excavata Herting, 1973
Uclesia fumipennis Girschner, 1901
Uclesia melancholica (Mesnil, 1953)
Uclesia nigrescens (Mesnil, 1953)
Uclesia petiolata (Villeneuve, 1929)
Uclesia retracta Aldrich, 1926
Uclesia simyrae Herting, 1966
Uclesia varicornis Curran, 1927
Uclesia zonalis Curran, 1927

References

Dexiinae
Tachinidae genera
Taxa named by Ernst August Girschner
Diptera of Asia
Diptera of Europe
Diptera of North America